La Dueña is a Venezuelan telenovela written by José Ignacio Cabrujas in collaboration with Julio César Marmol, and produced by Venezolana de Televisión in 1984. The plot was inspired by the novel The Count of Monte Cristo written by Alexandre Dumas, though they changed the protagonist from male to female. La Dueña is considered one of the best telenovelas made in Venezuela.

Amanda Gutiérrez and Daniel Alvarado starred as the main protagonists with María Cristina Lozada as the antagonist.

Plot
In 1928, Esteban Rigores lies wounded on a beach after taking part ina  failed coup against the brutal regime of Gen. Juan Vicente Gómez. Fearing death is near, he orders Basilio, his mute servant, to search for Adriana, his daughter, and leave her his fortune. Neither Esteban nor Basilio know what Adriana looks like. When Basilio asks the girl's mother, Beatriz Ayala, now married to Salvador Asensio, one of Gomez's ministers, about the girl, she lies to him that her daughter died in childbirth, or at least that is what her parents told her. Unconvinced, Basilio goes to the house of Don Alejandro, Esteban's friend. There, she meets Adriana, and he immediately recognizes her as Esteban's daughter. But Adriana doesn't know her origins, believing she is an orphan adopted by Alejandro out of charity. Although Alejandro and Encarnación, his wife, have always been kind to Adriana, she is nothing but a glorified servant. Their children, the selfish María Consuelo looks down on her, idealistic Luis Alberto loves her secretly, and young María Eugenia who's always seen Adriana as a sister, now resents her when she realises her fiancé is attracted to the girl's beauty. Ma. Eugenia's fiancé, the arrogant Captain Mauricio Lofiego, is a man used to getting whatever he wants, a trait he has inherited from Purificacion Burgos, his mother. Purificacion is not only one of the richest women in Venezuela, but she's also got General Gomez's ear. Few people are know that Burgos's fortune comes from prostitution.

Adriana gives Alejandro the documents she's unable to read since they're written in French and English. Alejandro discovers that Adriana is now the owner of a huge fortune. That same evening, Mauricio breaks off his engagement with María Eugenia and makes love to Adriana. Alejandro sees him leaving the girl's room and vows revenge. Several attempts are made to separate Adriana and Mauricio, but their love grows stronger, especially after she discovers she is pregnant. Meanwhile, a recovered Esteban and Beatriz have joined efforts to investigate the whereabouts of their child. Adriana plans to escape with Mauricio, but she disappears mysteriously. Under the orders of Alejandro and Purificacion, she is taken to a mental asylum where she is subjected to horrible tortures, and she loses her baby and her mind. Believing Adriana lied to him, Mauricio married Maria Eugenia.

Several years go by, and Adriana has lost her beauty and mind, but she has two friends at the asylum, the kind Helena, and Saul, a political prisoner. When Gomez dies, Saul escapes the asylum together with Adriana and Helena. Adriana finds Basilio who directs her to her father Esteban who had escaped to Paris. Esteban will utilise his fortune to restore his daughter's beauty and educate her. In 1941, Adriana returns to Caracas, rich and powerful, newly transformed as Ximena, but she is called "La Dueña", and ready to take revenge against the families that locked her up.

Cast
Amanda Gutiérrez as Adriana Rigores Ayala / Ximena Sáenz
Daniel Alvarado as Capt. Mauricio Lofriego
Héctor Mayerston as Esteban Rigores
Mariela Alcalá as María Eugenia Tellez
María Cristina Lozada as Purificación Burgos de Lofiego
Carlota Sosa as María Consuelo Tellez
Lucio Bueno as Radamés Parisí
Ana Castell as María Benita
Helianta Cruz as Beatriz Ayala de Asensio
Ramon Hinojosa as Cirilo
Eduardo Gadea Perez as Manuel Antonio Lofiego
Omar Omaña as Abelardo Lofiego
Rafael Briceño as Gen. Juan Vicente Gómez
Agustina Martin as Mercedes Antonini
Freddy Salazar as Alejandro Tellez
Fina Rojas as Elvira
Flor Elena González as Eloiza Lofiego
William Moreno as Ildemaro
Raul Mendez as Pablo
Carlos Acosta as Javier Perentena
Leticia Calderón as AnaMario Brito as Basilio
Leopoldo Regnault as Saúl GalvánOlga Henriquez as EncarnaciónRemakes
2006: Dueña y Señora (filmed in Puerto Rico and broadcast on Telemundo) starring Karla Monroig & Angel Viera2013: La Patrona (filmed in Mexico and broadcast on Telemundo)
2015 Santa Bárbara'' (filmed in Portugal and broadcast on TVI)

References

External links
La Dueña at the Internet Movie Database

Venezuelan telenovelas
Venezolana de Televisión original programming
1984 telenovelas
1984 Venezuelan television series debuts
1985 Venezuelan television series endings